Turkey sent a team to compete at the 2010 Summer Youth Olympics in Singapore.

Competitors

Medal summary

Medal table

Medalists

Results by event

3-on-3 basketball

Boys

Aquatics

Swimming 

Boys

Girls

Archery

Boys' recurve

Girls' recurve

Mixed recurve

Athletics

Boys

Girls

Badminton

Boys

Girls

Boxing

Boys

Fencing

Boys

Mixed

Football

Girls

Gymnastics

Artistic

Boys

Girls

Judo

Boys

Girls

Mixed

Rowing

Boys

Girls

Sailing

Boys

Girls

Taekwondo

Boys

Girls

Weightlifting 

Boys

Girls

Wrestling

Boys,  freestyle

Boys, Grecoroman

External links
Competitors List: Turkey

2010 in Turkish sport
Nations at the 2010 Summer Youth Olympics
Summer 2010